Killing Floor (or /dev/null) is the eponymously titled debut studio album of Killing Floor, released on March 14, 1995, by Re-Constriction Records.

Reception

AllMusic gave Killing Floor a mixed review, crediting the quality of the Killing Floor's work even although noting that the band was adding nothing new to the industrial rock genre. Aiding & Abetting  called it an effective debut for the band, saying "the production is superb, bringing the proper feel to each tune" and "nothing in the sound shrinks from exposure; all components are properly acknowledged." Fabryka Music Magazine gave the album four out of four called it the band's greatest merging of guitar driven industrial rock, electronic and coldwave music, saying "genius songs like "In Decline", "Two Dimes", "What Is the Truth?" and "Glass" should be put amongst the classic songs of industrial rock and coldwave styles." Sonic Boom commended the originality of the band and called the album one of the best dance mixed with guitar-based industrial rock albums they had reviewed.

Track listing

Personnel 
Adapted from the Killing Fields liner notes.

Killing Floor
 James Basore – drums, drum programming, tape, production, engineering, mixing
 John Belew – sampler, electronics, programming, musical arrangement, production, engineering, mixing
 Christian Void (as Christian Void) – lead vocals, sampler, electronics, production, engineering, mixing
 Marc Phillips – electric guitar, bass guitar, backing vocals, production, engineering, mixing
 Karl Tellefsen – electric guitar, bass guitar, production, engineering, mixing

Production and additional personnel
 Bernt Bergdorf – engineering and mixing (5)
 Walter Dahn – cover art
 Keith Hillebrandt – editing
 Jimmy Lyons – recording, scratching (5)
 Mark Pistel – engineering and mixing (1)
 Josh T. Roberts – engineering, mixing
 Michael Romanowski – mastering
 Bart Thurber – recording, engineering and mixing (6, 9)

Release history

References

External links 
 

1995 debut albums
Killing Floor (American band) albums
Re-Constriction Records albums